Caniggia Ginola Elva (born 14 July 1996) is a professional soccer player who plays as a midfielder for Regionalliga club Rot-Weiß Erfurt. Born in Saint Lucia, he has represented Canada at under-23 level.

Early life
Elva was born in the Caribbean island of St. Lucia in Vieux Fort, before moving to Canada at the age of 11. He began playing youth soccer with Calgary South West United. When he was 17, he received a tryout with English club Arsenal. After Arsenal decided not to sign him, he went on trial with German Bundesliga side VfB Stuttgart in November 2013, joining them for a month, before returning and signing with them officially on his 18th birthday.

Club career

VfB Stuttgart
On 14 July 2014, his 18th birthday, he signed a four-year contract with them after tryouts with other teams, among them English Premier League football club Arsenal, Spanish club FC Barcelona and Portuguese club SL Benfica. However, due to Elva not able gaining Canadian citizenship, he wasn't granted permission to play neither for Stuttgart's reserve team in the 3. Liga nor their youth team in Under 19 Bundesliga. As a result of this he did not gain any match practice as he was not ready for the club's first team.

Loan to Strasbourg
On 2 February 2015, he was loaned to French third-tier club RC Strasbourg until the end of the season.

VfB Stuttgart II
For the 2015–16 season Elva joined the squad of VfB Stuttgart II. He made his debut for VfB II on 29 August 2015 against Rot-Weiß Erfurt. Elva scored his first goal for VfB Stuttgart II on 26 February 2016 against Hallescher FC. After making 57 appearances over three seasons with the second team, he was released by Stuttgart in July 2018.

Würzburger Kickers
Elva signed with 3. Liga club Würzburger Kickers on 4 September 2018. With the Kickers, he won the 2019 Bavarian Cup. Elva would score 4 goals and add 2 assists during an injury plagued 2018–19 season. After the season, he rejected an offer to extend his contract with the club.

FC Ingolstadt 04
After one year with Würzburger Kickers, Elva would sign a two year contract with fellow 3. Liga side FC Ingolstadt 04.

Rot-Weiß Erfurt
In January 2023, Elva would sign with Regionalliga club Rot-Weiß Erfurt.

International career

Youth
Elva is eligible for St. Lucia, where he was born. He has however indicated that he would like to represent Canada at international level instead, where he was raised. In March 2017 it was announced that Elva was added to the Canadian Under-23 squad for matches against Qatar and Uzbekistan in Qatar later that month. Elva made his U-23 debut and scored against Uzbekistan in a 1-0 victory on 25 March 2017.

Senior
Elva was called up to the Canadian senior team for a friendly against El Salvador on 29 September 2017. In June 2021 Elva was included in Canada's 60-man preliminary roster for the 2021 CONCACAF Gold Cup.

Personal life
His father, Titus "Titi" Elva, is a former national striker for St. Lucia and his uncle, Olivier Elva, is also a former national defender for St. Lucia. His first and middle names Caniggia and Ginola are homages to former Argentine international player Claudio Caniggia and former French player David Ginola.

Career statistics

Club

References

External links

1996 births
Living people
People from Vieux Fort, Saint Lucia
Saint Lucian emigrants to Canada
Naturalized citizens of Canada
Canadian soccer players
Association football forwards
VfB Stuttgart II players
RC Strasbourg Alsace players
Würzburger Kickers players
FC Ingolstadt 04 players
3. Liga players
Regionalliga players
Black Canadian soccer players
Canadian people of Saint Lucian descent
Canada men's youth international soccer players
Canadian expatriate soccer players
Canadian expatriate sportspeople in Germany
Expatriate footballers in Germany